State Highway 29 (SH 29) is a State Highway in Kerala, India that starts at junction of NH 212 at Chundale near Kalpetta and ends in Kerala State Boundary with Tamil Nadu. This highway was originally Kozhikode - Vythiri - State Border and was 97 km long. After the section of the highway from Kozhikode until Chundale became part of NH 212, this highway is now 31.0 km long.

This highway now passes through only Wayanad district.

Route 
NH 212 - Chundale - Meppadi - Vaduvanchal - Choladi - State Boundary - Road to Gudalur & Ooty

See also 
Roads in Kerala
List of State Highways in Kerala

References 

State Highways in Kerala
Roads in Wayanad district